Chittarkottai is a  Panchayat in Ramanathapuram district, Tamil Nadu, India. It has consists of seven villages with different faiths of Religions people. Most of the People following Hinduism and Islamic Culture. Remaining People following Religion of  Christianity. The Coastline along with 'Bay of Bengal'. People incomes are based on Agriculture harvesting and Fishing. This Village has the Mohamedia Higher Secondary School and Government High school Palanivalasai  in palanivalasai sub village which is the best educational school in Ramanathapuram District. Nearby Syed Ammal arts and science College is there, also one Municipal Maternity home is Located. Some Beautiful East Coast  Beaches  are available for spending time with Family and The village is famous for the Murugan temple Temple near the sea in Mudiveeran Pattinam (a sub-village in chittar kottai ). There is a famous and famous temple which is visited by many people every year.

Panchayat
Chittarkottai is Village Panchayat
Present Panchayat President Mrs. Musthari Jahan was elected during 2020 election.

Geography 
It is situated 13 km North East from Ramanathapuram. Devipattinam is 5 km from Chittarkottai. The Chennai - Rameshwaram bypass road is crossing chittarkottai. The geographical position is: 9.4287N / 78.9005E

Education 

Mohamedia Higher Secondary School is very famous educational source around East Ramnathapuram with good results.
Mohamedia primary school founded on 1905 It has developed as 
mohamedia middle school on 1957
Then mohamedia high school on 1971 
as of now Mohamedia higher secondary school is successful creating students from the surrounding villages.
after the development of Mohamedia Higher Secondary School, the area's education level went up to 95% and nowadays girls are studying more and better.

History

References

External links
Chittarkottai Official Website (tamil)

Cities and towns in Ramanathapuram district